Aloysius Chen Guodi (7 November 1875 - 9 March 1930) was a Chinese Catholic priest and Bishop of the Roman Catholic Diocese of Fenyang from 1926 to 1930 until his death.

Biography
Chen was born in Changzhi, Shanxi, Qing Empire on November 7, 1875. He entered the Franciscans in 1896 in a village named Dong'ergou.  He was ordained a priest on March 13, 1903. He then served as a missionary for nine years and then became secretary to two Italian bishops. In addition to teaching Latin and apologetics at the Taiyuan Priesthood Seminary, he led a Catholic middle school in the city. This was the only Catholic middle school in Shanxi at that time. He was appointed apostolic vicar by Fenyang on May 10, 1926, and was consecrated by Pope Pius XI on October 28, 1926. He was one of six Chinese bishops ordained over 200 years. In May 1927 he went to Fenyang and died of lung disease there three years later.

References

1875 births
1930 deaths
People from Changzhi
20th-century Roman Catholic bishops in China